Camey Spur (Camey) was a small town in southeastern Denton County, Texas, located at what is now the intersection of State Highway 121 and W Spring Creek Pkwy. It was established around 1852 and named after Capt. William McKamy.  For a time is served as a spur on the St. Louis-San Francisco Railway. Not to be confused with Spur, Texas, a post office operated in Camey Spur from 1913 through 1925. According to a Dallas Morning News archive, in 1914 the community had a cotton gin that burnt down in 1925, two general stores, and a population of 30. During the 1930s and 40s, it had two businesses and a population of forty-seven.

1852 establishments in Texas
Former cities in Texas
Geography of Denton County, Texas
Ghost towns in North Texas